A solid-state nuclear track detector or SSNTD (also known as an etched track detector or a dielectric track detector, DTD) is a sample of a solid material (photographic emulsion, crystal, glass or plastic) exposed to nuclear radiation (neutrons or charged particles, occasionally also gamma rays), etched, and examined microscopically. The tracks of nuclear particles are etched faster than the bulk material, and the size and shape of these tracks yield information about the mass, charge, energy and direction of motion of the particles. The main advantages over other radiation detectors are the detailed information available on individual particles, the persistence of the tracks allowing measurements to be made over long periods of time, and the simple, cheap and robust construction of the detector.

The basis of SSNTDs is that charged particles damage the detector within nanometers along the track in such a way that the track can be etched many times faster than the undamaged material. Etching, typically for several hours, enlarges the damage to conical pits of micrometer dimensions, that can be observed with a microscope. For a given type of particle, the length of the track gives the energy of the particle. The charge can be determined from the etch rate of the track compared to that of the bulk. If the particles enter the surface at normal incidence, the pits are circular; otherwise the ellipticity and orientation of the elliptical pit mouth indicate the direction of incidence.

SSNTDs are commonly used to study cosmic rays, long-lived radioactive elements, radon concentration in houses, and the age of geological samples.

A material commonly used in SSNTDs is polyallyl diglycol carbonate (PADC), also known as Tastrak, CR-39 and CR39. It is a clear, colorless, rigid plastic with the chemical formula C12H18O7. Etching to expose radiation damage is typically performed using solutions of caustic alkalis such as sodium hydroxide, often at elevated temperatures for several hours.

See also
nuclear track detectors that are not solid state
cloud chamber
bubble chamber
solid-state (semiconductor) nuclear detectors that do not record tracks
surface-barrier detector
silicon drift detector
lithium-drifted silicon detector - Si(Li)
intrinsic detector
ion track

External links
 Gregory Choppin, Jan-Olov Liljenzin, Jan Rydberg Radiochemistry and Nuclear Chemistry, Chapter 8, "Detection and Measurement Techniques"

Nuclear physics
Particle detectors